Algerine means someone from or something related to Algeria or Algiers. It may also refer to:

Ships
, various ships of the Royal Navy
Three ship classes:

In geography
 Algerine Hill, New York, US, a mountain
 Algerine Island, Nunavut, Canada
 Algerine Channel, Nunavut, separating Patterson Island (Findlay Group) and Harrison Island
 Algerine Seamount, a seamount in the Atlantic Ocean

Horses
 Algerine (horse) (1873–c. 1892), an American Thoroughbred racehorse, winner of the 1876 Belmont Stakes

See also
Algerino (disambiguation)